Arhopala opalina, the opal oakblue, is a species of lycaenid or blue butterfly found in Assam, Burma, Thailand, the Malay Peninsula and Java.

References

Arhopala
Butterflies of Asia
Taxa named by Frederic Moore
Butterflies described in 1883